Jean de Bonsi (Florence, 1554 – 4 July 1621) was born in Florence, Italy to Domenico Bonsi, prime minister of the Duke of Tuscany, and Costanza Vettori.

Early life and studies
He studied in University of Padua canon and civil law. Ferdinando I de' Medici, Grand Duke of Tuscany, named him an arbiter on the differences between him and Pope Clement VIII, concerning territorial limits. Later he became lawyer in Rome.

Episcopate
He was named Bishop of Béziers (nowadays part of the Archdiocese of Montpellier) after his uncle Tommaso Bonsi on 11 February 1598 and consecrated on 30 September that year. He served as bishop till 1611 and was succeeded by his nephew Domenico Bonsi - coadjutor bishop of the same diocese, followed by other members of De Bonsi family.

Cardinalate
Jean de Bonsi was created cardinal priest in the consistory of 17 August 1611 by Pope Paul V. Later in 1615 he received the red hat and was appointed to the title of S.Clemente until 1621 when he was opted for the title of Sant'Eusebio for about six months before his death on 4 July 1621 in Rome.

References

External links

 

1554 births
1621 deaths
Clergy from Florence
17th-century Italian cardinals
Bishops of Béziers
Italian emigrants to France